The April 7, 1963, race at Marlboro Motor Raceway  was the opening race of the thirteenth season of the Sports Car Club of America's National Sports Car Championship.

A&B Production Results

References

External links
"Corvette News" magazine, 1963
Racing Sports Cars: SCCA archive
Dick Lang Racing History (blog)

Marlboro